The MEKO 140 is a frigate/corvette design by the German Blohm + Voss shipyard as part of the MEKO family of vessels. The MEKO 140 is a development of the Portuguese Navy's s designed by the Portuguese naval engineer Rogério de Oliveira in the late 1960s – three ships of which were built Blohm + Voss in 1970, as an outsourcing.

Concept and development 
MEKO is a concept in modern naval shipbuilding based on modularity of armament, electronics, and other equipment, aiming at ease of maintenance and cost reduction. Vessels of similar classes can use different weapons systems, as required by the customer. The MEKO 140 was designed in the late 1970s, and was chosen by the Argentine Navy to complement the MEKO 360 destroyers.

Variants
Six vessels of the MEKO 140 A16 variant were constructed in Argentina by the Río Santiago Shipyards (AFNE) near La Plata for the Argentine Navy.

Although considered by its designers to be frigates, the Espora-class vessels have been classed in Argentina as corvettes.

External links
 Argentine Navy (ARA) official site – class specifications & pictures 
 Description of MEKO 140 concept and existing ships

Frigate classes
Corvette classes